People's Democratic Temperance League was a temperance organization linked to the Finnish People's Democratic League (SKDL). KDRL was founded in the 1970s as the previous temperance movement attached to SKDL, the People's Temperance League was taken over by the so-called Taistoists, the orthodox pro-soviet wing of the Communist Party of Finland. In the early 1990s the KDRL changed its name to Kunnon Elämä.

See also
Temperance organizations

Finnish People's Democratic League
Temperance organizations
Alcohol in Finland